Austrosaginae, the sluggish katydids, are a subfamily of Australian insects within the family Tettigoniidae.

Genera
The following genera are included:
 Austrosaga Rentz, 1993
 Hemisaga Saussure, 1888
 Pachysaga Brunner von Wattenwyl, 1893
 Psacadonotus Redtenbacher, 1891
 Sciarasaga Rentz, 1993

References

Tettigoniidae
Orthoptera subfamilies
Orthoptera of Australia